Success rate is the fraction or percentage of success among a number of attempts to perform a procedure or task. It may refer to:

 Call setup success rate
 When success refers to attempts to induce pregnancy, then pregnancy rate is used:

See also 
 
 Failure rate
 Rate (disambiguation)
 Success (disambiguation)